Robert Fovent, alias Osegood, of Shaftesbury, Dorset, was an English Member of Parliament.

Family
Fovent was the second of Member of Parliament Robert Osegood alias Fovent, who died in 1377, of Fovant, Wiltshire and Shaftesbury and Margery, a daughter of MP, Thomas Platel, of Shaftesbury. Fovent married firstly, by 1384, Margaret née Herring and by 1405, he married a woman named Edith.

Career
In 1355, he was Mayor of Shaftesbury. He was a Member (MP) of the Parliament of England for Shaftesbury in January 1390.

References

Year of birth missing
Year of death missing
English MPs January 1390
Mayors of Shaftesbury